The 2021 Torneio Internacional de Manaus de Futebol Feminino (also known as the 2021 International Tournament of Manaus) was the tenth edition of the Torneio Internacional de Futebol Feminino, an invitational women's football tournament held every December in Brazil. The tournament ran in between 25 November–1 December, 2021.

Format
The four teams played each other within the group in a single round. The team with the most points earned in the group, was declared as the winner.

Venues
All matches took place at Arena da Amazônia in Manaus.

Squads

Standings

Results
All times are local (UTC−04:00)

Goalscorers

References

External links
Official Official Tournament Page in Portuguese

2021 in women's association football
2021 in Brazilian women's football
2021